Abano Mineral Lake Natural Monument is a small karst lake in Kazbegi Municipality in Truso valley on the left bank of Terek River, to the east of the village Abano at 2,127 m above sea level.

Lake characteristics 
The lake was created by a carbon dioxide filled underground stream flowing to the surface through carbonate rocks from the late Jurassic period. The lake "boils" loudly with carbon dioxide bubbles bursting. The outflow of the stream is 2.5 million liters per 24 hours. The total surface area of the lake is 0.04 ha. The emission of gas in calm weather causes carbon dioxide to accumulate in lower levels. Small animals suffocate when they get near the lake, which is why there are dead animals there, such as mice, lizards, frogs and some birds.

It is part of Kazbegi Protected Areas along with Kazbegi National Park and five Natural Monuments:
Sakhizari Cliff,
Abano Mineral Lake,
Truso Travertine,
Jvari Pass Travertine,
Keterisi Mineral Vaucluse.

See also 
 List of natural monuments of Georgia

References

Carbon dioxide
Geography of Mtskheta-Mtianeti
Lakes of Georgia (country)
Natural monuments of Georgia (country)